Emamzadeh Mahmud may refer to:
 Emamzadeh Mahmud, Kohgiluyeh and Boyer-Ahmad
 Emamzadeh Mahmud, Mazandaran